Dwight Darwin Opperman (June 26, 1923 – June 13, 2013) was an American businessman and lawyer. He was chairman of Key Investments, a privately held venture capital firm focusing on high-tech ventures. Previously, Opperman was the CEO of West Publishing Company (now known as Thomson Reuters) in St. Paul, Minnesota and while he was CEO the company moved into technology products with the creation of the Westlaw legal database. 

Opperman was born in Perry, Iowa, and "grew up poor". He received his law degree from Drake University Law School in Des Moines, Iowa.  He has since served on the Board of Trustees of Drake University and endowed the Opperman Scholars program which provides scholarships to 5 incoming 1Ls each year.  These are full-tuition scholarships along with a cash stipend (most recently, $10,000 per year) for living expenses. They are renewable provided the student remains in the upper third of his or her class. Opperman also endowed the Dwight D. Opperman Constitutional Law Lecture at Drake, a lecture given annually by the nation's foremost scholars in the field of constitutional law - most often, U.S. Supreme Court justices. Past lecturers include: Chief Justice John G. Roberts Jr., Justice Stephen Breyer, Justice Antonin Scalia, Justice Clarence Thomas, Chief Justice William H. Rehnquist, Justice Ruth Bader Ginsburg, Justice Sandra Day O'Connor, Justice Anthony M. Kennedy, Justice Lewis F. Powell, and Justice Harry A. Blackmun. Justice Thomas thought so much of the experience that he returned in 2000, 2002 and 2006 to teach a special one-week seminar on the Supreme Court. Drake's main law building and law library were named in Opperman's honor and in 1994, a campus plaza was dedicated in memory of his wife, Jeanice Opperman, who died in 1993. He has also donated to the New York University School of Law and Hamline University School of Law.

In 2002, Forbes 400 ranked Opperman as the 239th richest person in the United States; in 2004, his rank was 315th; in 2006, 374th.

His first wife Jeanice died in 1993 and he married Julie Chrystyn in 2008. 

Opperman died after a short illness on June 13, 2013, at home in Bel Air, Los Angeles previously having lived in the apple orchard portion of White Bear Lake, Minnesota

References

External links
Dwight Opperman ranked #374 on the 2006 Forbes 400
 Opperman Scholarship at Drake Law School; see also Constitutional Law Center 
 Westlaw, established by Opperman at West Publishing
Other obituary sources
 2013-06-13 upd 10:49pm Star Tribune 
 2013-06-20 LOC Law Library blog 
 2013-06-24 Drake U Law School 

1923 births
2013 deaths
American publishers (people) 
Hamline University alumni
People from Perry, Iowa
Drake University Law School alumni